Chactunx is a settlement in the municipality of Maxcanú in Yucatán state, Mexico. This village is between the towns of Maxcanú and Halachó.

See also
Halachó
Maxcanú

References

Populated places in Yucatán